Trinidadians and Tobagonians, colloquially known as Trinis or Trinbagonians, are the people who are identified with the country of Trinidad and Tobago. The country is home to people of many different national, ethnic and religious origins. As a result, Trinidadians do not equate their nationality with race and  ethnicity, but with citizenship, identification with the islands as whole, or either Trinidad or Tobago specifically. Although citizens make up the majority of Trinidadians, there is a substantial number of Trinidadian expatriates, dual citizens and descendants living worldwide, chiefly elsewhere in the Anglosphere.

Population

The total population of Trinidad and Tobago was 1,328,019 according to the 2011 census, an increase of 5.2 per cent since the 2000 census.
According to the 2012 revision of the World Population Prospects the total population was estimated at 1,328,000 in 2010, compared to only 646,000 in 1950. The proportion of children below the age of 15 in 2010 was 20.7 per cent, 71 per cent was between 15 and 65 years of age, while 8.3 per cent was 65 years or older.

Ethnic groups
The ethnic composition of Trinidad and Tobago reflects a history of conquest and immigration. While the earliest inhabitants were of Amerindian heritage, since the 20th century the two dominant groups in the country were those of South Asian and of African heritage.

Indians-South Asian
Indo-Trinidadian and Tobagonians make up the country's largest ethnic group (approximately 35.43 percent). They are primarily descendants from indentured workers from South Asia and India, brought to replace freed African slaves who refused to continue working on the sugar plantations from other Islands. Through cultural preservation residents of Indian descent continue to maintain traditions from their ancestral homeland.

Sub-Saharan African
Afro-Trinidadians and Tobagonians make up the country's second largest ethnic group, with approximately 34.22 percent of the population. Afro-Trinidadians are the descendants of enslaved West and Central Africans brought to the islands by multiple European parties through the trans-Atlantic slave trade. However, a good percentage of the Black population are descendants of people enslaved on other islands of the Caribbean, and later migrated to Trinidad and Tobago for various reasons, especially Martinique, Guadeloupe, Saint Vincent and Grenada. Other Afro-Trinidadians trace their ancestry to American slaves recruited to fight for the British in the War of 1812 or from indentured labourers from West Africa.

Other origins
Chinese, Amerindians, Europeans, Arabs, Hispanic/Latinos, Douglas (mixed Indian and African), multiracial people, and Jews, reside in Trinidad and Tobago. White Trinidadians are descendants of Spanish, British, Portuguese or German settlers. A small mixed indigenous Carib population is present around the Santa Rosa Carib Community. There is also a Cocoa panyol population who are of Spanish, indigenous, and African descent who came from Venezuela between the late 19th and early 20th century to work on the cocoa estates.

Emigration
Emigration from Trinidad and Tobago, as with other Caribbean nations, has historically been high; most emigrants go to the United States, Canada, and Britain. Emigration has continued, albeit at a lower rate, even as the birth-rate sharply dropped to levels typical of industrialised countries. Largely because of this phenomenon, as of 2011, Trinidad and Tobago has been experiencing a low population growth rate (0.48 per cent).

Famous Trinidadians and Tobagonians

See also 

 Demographics of Trinidad and Tobago
 Prime Ministers of Trinidad and Tobago
 Arab
 Hispanic-Latino
 Cocoa panyols
 Culture of Trinidad and Tobago
 Trinidadian and Tobagonian Americans

References